Lake Butler is a city in and the county seat of Union County, Florida, United States. The population was 1,897 at the 2010 census.

History

A post office called Lake Butler has been in operation since 1860. The city was named for Robert Butler, an acting governor of East Florida.

Geography

Lake Butler is located at  (30.021681, –82.340960).

Demographics

As of the census of 2000, there were 1,927 people, 723 households, and 508 families residing in the city. The racial makeup of the city was 64.50% White, 31.81% African American, 0.26% Native American, 0.83% Asian, 0.10% Pacific Islander, 1.19% from other races, and 1.30% from two or more races. Hispanic or Latino of any race were 3.68% of the population.

There were 723 households, out of which 41.1% had children under the age of 18 living with them, 39.7% were married couples living together, 26.4% had a female householder with no husband present, and 29.7% were non-families. 26.7% of all households were made up of individuals, and 10.2% had someone living alone who was 65 years of age or older.  The average household size was 2.63 and the average family size was 3.16.

In the city, the population was spread out, with 33.6% under the age of 18, 10.6% from 18 to 24, 25.2% from 25 to 44, 18.8% from 45 to 64, and 11.8% who were 65 years of age or older. The median age was 30 years. For every 100 females, there were 85.5 males. For every 100 females age 18 and over, there were 79.3 males.

The median income for a household in the city was $25,347, and the median income for a family was $29,000. Males had a median income of $26,951 versus $20,814 for females. The per capita income for the city was $14,174.  About 22.3% of families and 25.6% of the population were below the poverty line, including 30.6% of those under age 18 and 28.8% of those age 65 or over.

Education

Public primary and secondary schools in Lake Butler and Union County are administered by Union County School District, which is governed by an elected, five-member Union County School Board. The district administers four schools, one elementary school that services Pre-K–4th grade, one middle school that services 5th–8th grade, one high school, Union County High School (Florida) that services 9th–12th grade and one Adult Education program.

Economy

As of 1985 almost all of the residents of Lake Butler work in Florida Department of Corrections prisons, are related to prison employees, do business with prison employees, and/or know prison employees.

Notable people

 Jay North, played the character "Dennis" in the TV series Dennis the Menace (1959–1963)
 Andrew Peterson, Christian singer-songwriter
 C. J. Spiller, former NFL running back
 Gerard Warren, former NFL defensive tackle

References

External links

The Lake Butler Community Page
Union County, Florida - Info & History
History of Lake Butler, Florida

County seats in Florida
Cities in Union County, Florida
Cities in Florida